Richard Conlin is a former member of the Seattle City Council, first elected to council in 1997 and reelected in 2001, 2005, and 2009.  He was elected, unanimously, by the council to be its president on January 7, 2008 and was unanimously reelected on January 4, 2010.

He was defeated in the 2013 election by Kshama Sawant of Socialist Alternative.

Council duties 
As of August 2006, Conlin is chair of the Environment, Emergency Management & Utilities Committee, and chair of the Annexation Committee.

Conlin was a member of Urban Planning & Development Committee; and of Parks, Education, Libraries & Labor Committee. The areas of his focus were public health, sustainability, and the environment. Under the banner of environment, he was involved in efforts to improve the salmon population.

Conlin was involved in emergency response planning for Seattle.

Background 
Conlin received a B.A. in history from Michigan State University (1968), as well as a master's degree in Political Science (1971).  He was elected to two terms (1973–1976) as an Ingham County Commissioner, representing part of the City of East Lansing.

Prior to being elected to Seattle City Council, Conlin directed the Community and Environment Division at Metrocenter YMCA from 1985 to 1996, where started the Earth Service Corps, expanded the Master Home Environmentalist certification (aimed at household waste and pollution) and co-founded the policy group Sustainable Seattle.

Conlin spent time teaching public administration at the University of Botswana and University of Swaziland.

Plastic bags
Conlin sponsored the 2007 Zero Waste Strategy, Resolution 30990 which directed Seattle Public Utilities to produce recommendations on how to eliminate residential solid waste, including whether to ban or tax plastic shopping bags and Styrofoam food containers. In 2008 Conlin sponsored a bill to phase out plastic bags in Seattle, a 20-cent surcharge on bags. Businesses with under one million dollars in annual sales were exempt and got to keep the money. The measure passed the city council by a 6-1 margin.

On August 8, 2008, Washington Food Industry, a trade group representing grocery stores, launched a petition drive to nullify the ordinance through citizens' referendum, funded in part by the plastics industry. On September 15, the petition was certified by the King County Elections Office, delaying implementation of the fee until after a public vote. On August 18, 2009, Seattle voters rejected the fee, 53 to 47 percent. A new plastic bag ban and paper bag fee passed in 2011.

Recall effort
On May 31, 2011, a recall effort was announced.  Proponents cited Conlin for three alleged violations of law: signing the draft environmental-impact statement of the proposed Seattle waterfront tunnel in lieu of Mayor Mike McGinn, colluding with City Attorney Peter Holmes, and failing to place a certified initiative on the ballot.  On July 22, 2011, King Count Superior Court Judge Carol Schapira dismissed the recall petition, which would have required proving Conlin committed malfeasance or an illegal act to go forward.

NBA/NHL arena opposition
On October 15, 2012, both the King County Council and Seattle City Council approved a financing plan for a $490 million sports arena in the Seattle's Sodo neighborhood, backed by venture capitalist Chris Hansen.  The King County Council vote was 9–0, while the City Council vote was 7–2, with Conlin and Nick Licata as the only opposition.  The new arena was intended to host the NBA Seattle SuperSonics professional basketball team as well as a potential NHL ice hockey team.

2013 election and defeat
In 2013, Seattle Central Community College and Seattle University economics professor Kshama Sawant ran for election as a Socialist Alternative candidate for Conlin's seat on the Seattle City Council. She won 35% of the vote in the August primary election, and advanced into the general election against Conlin. On November 15, 2013, Conlin conceded to Sawant after late returns showed him down by 1,640 votes or approximately 1% of the vote.

Council Leadership
For a point in his tenure on the council, Conlin served as council president.

References

External links 
Richard Conlin's campaign website
Seattle Post-Intelligencer's candidate voters' guide

1948 births
Living people
Washington (state) Democrats
County commissioners in Michigan
Seattle City Council members
Michigan State University alumni
Politicians from Washington, D.C.